Javier Souza Díaz (born 13 November 1929) is a Mexican sprinter. He competed in the men's 100 metres at the 1952 Summer Olympics.

References

1929 births
Living people
Athletes (track and field) at the 1952 Summer Olympics
Mexican male sprinters
Olympic athletes of Mexico
Place of birth missing (living people)
Pan American Games medalists in athletics (track and field)
Pan American Games bronze medalists for Mexico
Athletes (track and field) at the 1951 Pan American Games
Athletes (track and field) at the 1955 Pan American Games
Competitors at the 1954 Central American and Caribbean Games
Central American and Caribbean Games bronze medalists for Mexico
Central American and Caribbean Games medalists in athletics
Medalists at the 1955 Pan American Games
20th-century Mexican people